The IC3 (or class MF) is a Danish-built high-comfort medium/long distance diesel multiple-unit train. The sets were built by ABB Scandia (later purchased by Adtranz, which itself was subsequently acquired by Bombardier Transportation) in Randers. This train model has been operating in Denmark, Sweden and Israel since 1990. The name indicates simply that it is a three-carriage InterCity trainset.

An electrically powered four-carriage version, the IR4 was introduced between 1995 and 1998.

General overview 

The IC3 is a wide articulated train made of light alloy with Jacobs bogies shared between carriages.

The efficient mechanical transmissions with multiple gear ratios and high power for the  tare weight give the IC3 good acceleration capabilities. The short distances between stations on inter-city routes in Denmark makes acceleration more important than high top speed, and so the IC3 units are geared for a top service speed of only .

The front- and cab-design is the most significant feature of the IC3 (and its cousins). When viewed from the outside, the viewer will notice the large rubber diaphragm surrounding a flat cab. The cab is separate section of the train, but the table with the controls is mounted on a large door, to which the seat is also mounted. When two or more trainsets are coupled together in a single train, the entire front door folds away to give a wide passage, and the rubber diaphragms at the ends form a flush aerodynamic seal. The IC3 can also couple and run in tandem with the electrical version, the IR4. Up to five trainsets can be coupled together. The IC3 can also be coupled mechanically with its Flexliner little sister, IC2', but not the cousin ET-FT-ET.

DSB, runs 96 IC3 sets and 44 IR4 sets.

Some IC3s run in Sweden, mainly Kalmar-Linköping. They are designated Y2. Before 2007 they also ran Malmö-Karlskrona (designated Y2K; adapted to run in Denmark as well), but that railway has been electrified, and after that 13 sets were sold to Denmark and Israel, and one scrapped because of a truck collision causing the death of a train driver. Six sets still run in Sweden.

Another large operator of the IC3 trains is Israel Railways, who operate about 50 IC3 sets. Some of those sets were assembled in Israel from Danish-imported complete knock-down (CKD) kits by RAMTA, a division of Israel Aerospace Industries, and some are modified IC3 trainsets which were originally delivered to Sweden. Israel Railways have started to slowly retire their sets since 2021.

Similarly in Spain, the national rail operator RENFE operates some IC3 derivatives classified as RENFE Class 594 on the Valladolid - Zamora - Puebla de Sanabria, Coruña - Ferrol, Coruña - Lugo - Monforte de Lemos and Madrid - Soria routes since 1997 as a medium-range regional service (Media Distancia) The Class 594 trains were built by CAF under a technology license agreement from ABB Scandia.

In 1997, an Israel Railways IC3 was tested in North America under the name ‘Flexliner’. Amtrak used it on the Hiawatha Service, St Louis and Kansas City Mules, San Diegan, and between Eugene and Portland, Oregon; Via Rail Canada tested it for services on the Windsor–Quebec corridor.

The total number of ABB Scandia/Adtranz-built IC3 and IC3-based trainsets is 202.

History 
Development of the IC3 started in 1984, production started in 1986, and they entered service in 1991. However, its roots can be traced back further. In 1972, DSB celebrated its 125th anniversary, and at the same time made some large changes. First of all, two years later, in 1974, a completely new timetable system, the K74, was introduced. Secondly, the concept of lyntog was removed as the foundation of the long-distance traffic, and instead a new InterCity concept took over that role. After a few years, a new concept emerged, the so-called APOs, which were work-groups tasked with specific areas. There were groups for electrical locomotives, diesel-powered locomotives, and others, including the "long distance train" APO group.

The long-distance train - APO was originally tasked with finding a suitable train for long-distance traffic. However, it was later rumoured that the lyntog-concept might be re-introduced within a few years, and so it was decided to find a suitable design for that concept. Several requirements were made: primarily to use air-conditioning for cooling and heating of passenger areas, and be able to use either electric or diesel propulsion. The second requirement were due to the fact, that the Danish politicians had yet to decide whether or not to fund a proposed electrification of the mainlines of the Danish railroads.
At the time, no such train were available, so the group designed one themselves. In order to avoid propulsion units in the train (and thus reducing variants and development costs), it was designed to use a locomotive to haul it, and equip the end wagons with driver cabins. The train was designed as a set of 5 wagons, with a service wagon in the middle (containing a small kiosk, and other facilities) and 4 passenger wagons.

In 1983, the group responsible for the timetables had made a set of requirements for the ideal future train for the InterCity traffic.The requirements were based on experience with the prototype (which had now become known as IC5): it should be light-weight (preferably built of aluminium), its passenger compartments should have fixed windows and air conditioning, it should be self-propelled, it should use standard engine and transmission components from the bus and truck industry, and it should be fast and easy to add carriages (by coupling with another trainset); along with a number of technical requirements. The new project became designated IC3.

After the IC3 project had been proposed, it was relatively quickly decided to cancel development of the IC5-prototype, as it suffered from several problems. The main problem was the weight of the train. A train of similar size and capacity, consisting of conventional wagons, would weigh approximately the same as originally estimated.
When it was first proposed to cancel the IC5 project, the train's designers tried to save it by proposing several solutions to the train's problems, but to no use: DSB's management had decided that the IC3 was the proper train for the future.

The task of developing the IC3 was assigned to a joint-group of designers and technical engineers from DSB itself and the factory Scandia (now a part of the Bombardier corporation). As a side note, it should be mentioned that neither DSB or Scandia themselves, wished that they (Scandia) got the task, as they had pretty much no experience in this kind of trains.

The first IC3 set was delivered in 1988, but unfortunately suffered from a number of teething problems, primarily due to its (at the time very advanced) computer systems. One example was that it would lock the toilet door with no apparent reason (it was programmed to lock the door when either someone was in there and requested so via a button, or when the toilet-system suffered a problem). Another issue was that snow would build up around the diaphragms and block the driver's view. By late 1990, the majority of these problems had been solved, and so the train entered service in 1991.

In 2017, DSB announced the IC3 stock would receive a 10-year life extension, allowing them to replace IC4 trains.

In 2018, the first six ERTMS-retrofitted IC3 trains left the workshop at Langå, with the conversions performed by Alstom with technical assistance from Banedanmark and DSB. All IC3's are to be converted to ERTMS from the proprietary ZUB 123 ATC system, which is to be done around the fall of 2019 and into 2020.

In 2021, DSB bought two sets from Israel Railways for spare parts.

In 2021, the Maritime and Commercial Court ruled that Deutz AG had misused a dominant market position in 2010 regarding replacement motor parts.

In 2021, Israel Railways is due to retire its IC3 fleet simultaneously with the introduction of Siemens Desiro HC electric multiple units. This would necessarily entail the permanent termination of services on the Jaffa-Jerusalem railway between Beit Shemesh and Jerusalem–Malha (which have already been suspended indefinitely due to the COVID-19 pandemic), as the journey cannot be travelled by Israel Railway's remaining rolling stock.

Technical overview 
An IC3 set consists of (as the name implies) three carriages. These are the MFA (passenger and motor carriage), the FF (passenger center carriage) and the MFB (passenger and motor carriage). The MFA and MFB are, from a technical point of view, identical and only differ slightly in the interior design.

The train is powered by four diesel engines, each delivering , giving the train a total  to propel it. The engines are mounted in the MFA and MFB carriages, with two engines in each carriage. Each engine drives the axles on the bogies via an electronically controlled automatic gearbox. The engines are mounted so that the end which would normally point forwards in a rear-wheel-drive car, instead faces the center of the MFA and MFB carriages. Due to this mounting design and nature of combustion engines and to the fact that the train runs forward in both directions, a so-called "reverse gear" had to be attached to automatic gearboxes. They are responsible for making the axles turn the right way. These gears are normally not controlled directly by the train's driver; instead, the train's on-board computers check which of the two cabs is active to determine the train's primary driving direction, setting the reverse gears accordingly.

Fleet details

Danish derivatives 
The IC3 has not only served as the backbone of the Danish InterCity concept for the past 15 years; it has also served as the foundation and/or inspiration for three other trains. These are the IR4, the IC2, and the Øresundtrain.

IR4 "InterRegional 4" 

The first of the IC3's offspring, which is electrically powered. It was originally designed for the Danish regional traffic, but has later been upgraded and is currently also being used in the InterCity traffic, often together with one or more IC3-set(s) on routes which have been electrified. The IR4 consists of 4 carriages (as implied by its name), all of which are similar in design to the MFA/MFB carriages (when viewed from the outside), with a wide set of doors in one end of each carriages. A total of 44 IR4 sets were built, and all sets are still in use. 1 set burned in 2011 but was rebuilt and re-entered service in 2015.

IC2 "InterCity 2" 
The second of the IC3's offspring is often described as a "discount edition of the IC3", which is not entirely fair. It was designed in 1992–1993, when some private railway operators in Denmark were looking for new trains. It was originally proposed to be an IC3 with the center carriage (the FF) removed, and without engines in one of the remaining carriages. This design did not entirely satisfy representatives of the private railways, so instead, after some debate, it was redesigned to its current appearance.

The IC2 consists of 2 carriages, the MF and the FS. The MF is a combined engine and passenger carriage, and has its set of doors placed towards the cab of the carriage, actually as close to the bogies as possible. The MF houses the engines, which are mounted under the floor in the middle of the carriage. It has two engines, delivering a total of 627 kW (840 hp), and drives the train in the same way as the MFA/MFB carriages drives the IC3.

The FS is a combined cab and passenger carriage, and has a quite unique look when viewed from the outside. This provides very easy access to the train, especially when bicycles, wheelchairs, and the like need to be put on the train.

There are some technical differences between the IC2 and the IC3. The most obvious is of course the smaller number of carriages, and other engines (the IC3 has four engines, each delivering approx. ; the IC2 has two engines, each delivering approx. ). Other differences include the way the engines are cooled (the IC3 engines are air-cooled, but due to several technical issues with this system, it were decided to use water-cooled engines), electric-driven AC system (another thing decided after experience with the IC3, which AC system were powered directly from the engines).

Although the IC2 shares its physical profile and physical coupling system with the IC3 and the IR4, they are incapable of actually driving as a companion with those two "relatives". This is because the designers of the computer system which transmits the driver's commands to the engines and gearboxes have not been able to come up with a common system for all three train models. Instead, for the different types to work together, a special interface-module is required. This must be built into each trainset (except from the IC3, from which the original command-signal comes). However, due to financial issues, and the fact that it would probably not be used, this module was not included in the trains (although it can easily be added if needed).

A total of thirteen IC2-sets were built, all of which are in service and operated by Lokaltog A/S since 2015.

Oresundtrain 
The third and newest of the IC3's offspring is specifically designed for use in the regional traffic in areas surrounding the Oresund Bridge. The train is operated by both DSB and SJ Öresund, with the latter being a sister company to SJ AB. Its formation is ET-FT-ET. The train is electrically powered, and can run on both Danish power (25 kV, 50 Hz) and Swedish power (15 kV, 16 Hz). It is called Contessa by its manufacturer, and designated Litra ET in Denmark and X31K in Sweden. Only the front and the cabin are similar to IC3. The wheels, bogies and motors are more similar to Bombardier Regina and each carriage has two bogies. It is used for the regional cross-border traffic called Øresundståg, and the train type is also often called that, these trains are used for some other traffic also.

Train fire 
Fires on the train sets are not uncommon, with over half of DSB's in service sets having either overheated or suffered from minor burns, however all of these were easy fixes. There have been some incidents where rebuilds were needed.

On 28 December 2010, an IC3 train in Israel caught fire due to a technical failure, injuring 121 people. A soldier shot the windows in order to allow the passengers to escape.
The cause of the fire was not an electrical short, as first suspected, but a mechanical problem with the cardan joint, which is located next to the fuel tank in the train.

On 30 December 2010 Israel Railways decided on an immediate stoppage of all the IC3s in the fleet, pending further investigation. The ramifications of this decision were the closure of several lines and stations, including Jerusalem and Dimona and several other suburban lines.
Service was resumed on all routes after modifications were approved.

On 20 October 2016, DSBs set number 51 caught fire in Odense, damaging the MFA significantly. No one was hurt, and the set was moved the day after. Then the rebuilding began, with a Swedish set donating its body to the damaged MFA unit. It was fitted with new engines and seats. The set was put rolling again in 2018, most notable is that this set was the first to be painted in DSBs newly formed design replacing the original grey with red, and the blue lines at the windows, became black. The passenger doors were painted white. Since the set are so far the only set in the new design, many enthusiasts has nicknamed the set “The One and Only”, which slowly has carried over to the personnel as well, although its official name remains “Niels Kjeldsen”.

Notes

See also 
IE 22000 Class
IC4
RegioSwinger
SNCB Class AM96

References 
 List of all Danish IC3 units - some with pictures and brief information (Danish) 
 Details on mechanical train transmissions

Multiple units of Denmark
Multiple units of Sweden
DSB multiple units
ABB multiple units
Diesel multiple units of Israel
Bombardier Transportation multiple units